Microsoft Schedule+ is a discontinued time management app developed by Microsoft. It was included by Microsoft in the Microsoft Office productivity suite since the Office 95 version. Since the Office 97 version, most of its functionality was incorporated into the Outlook 97 program.

History 
Schedule+ was originally developed by Microsoft as a companion to the Microsoft Mail email client, but was later shipped with Exchange Server 5.0, Microsoft Office 95, Exchange Client and Windows Messaging. The "Outlook Calendar" feature that was part of Outlook for Windows 3.1 and Macintosh versions before 9.0 was actually a new version of Schedule+. Since the loss of many features in Office 97, it was included on Office up to Microsoft Office 2003, although it was just to support conversion from Schedule+ 1.x. 

The first version of Schedule+ was released in 1992 for Windows 3.0 and classic Mac OS. Versions 2 through 6 were skipped, and the next version became version 7, released in 1995 for Windows 95 and classic Mac OS. Version 7.5 was included with Office 97 up to Office 2003.

Bugs

Year 2020+ Problem 

Attempting to run Microsoft Schedule+ 1.0 with the system clock year greater than 2019 leads to an error due to the software being designed to operate within a 100-year time window ranging from 1920 to 2019. This bug was fixed in version 7 onwards.

See also 
Lotus Organizer
Sun StarSchedule

References

Schedule Plus